Aleksandar Kolev (born 8 December 1992) is a Belgian-Bulgarian footballer who plays as a forward for CSKA 1948 Sofia.

Career

Early career
Born in Plovdiv, Kolev began his career in the Levski Sofia youth academy. He moved to Belgium with his family when he was 15 years old and joined local side Dessel Sport.

Kolev made his first team debut for Dessel Sport in a 2–1 home win over K.S.V. Oudenaarde on 12 February 2011. One month later, he scored his first goal in a 2–2 away draw against Olsa Brakel.

After good seasons in Dessel, Kolev joined Belgian Second Division team ASV Geel. He made his debut for the team in a match against White Star Bruxelles

Botev Plovdiv

2014–15
On 4 August 2014, Kolev signed a contract with the Bulgarian team Botev Plovdiv. He made his debut five days later, when he came in as an 86-minute substitute at the dramatic 3–3 draw against Litex Lovech. Kolev was included at the starting lineup of the match for the Bulgarian Supercup against Ludogorets Razgrad. Unfortunately, he received a red card at the end of the first half.

Kolev scored his first goal for Botev on 23 September 2014, when he came on as a substitute and scored the third goal in a 4–0 away win against Lokomotiv Mezdra in the first round of the Bulgarian Cup. On 28 October Kolev scored again in the next round of the Bulgarian Cup tournament. He scored a late equaliser in the derby game against Lokomotiv Plovdiv.

On 8 November, Kolev scored the winning goal in a 2–1 away win over Litex Lovech.

Alex Kolev was seriously injured in the beginning of the away game with Slavia on 29 November. Soon after that it was confirmed that the injury will rule him out for six months.

On 23 May 2015, after a long absence due to an injury, Kolev was included is the squad for the 1–2 away defeat from Beroe Stara Zagora but remained an unused substitute. A week later he came on as a substitute in the final minutes of the last game of the season, 0–2 defeat from Lokomotiv Sofia.

2015–16
On 25 July 2015, Kolev missed a penalty in the first half of a 6–0 away defeat at Montana. In the following game, the local derby with Lokomotiv Plovdiv, he scored a nice goal after an assist by Mariyan Ognyanov.

On 9 August, Kolev scored the winning goal against Pirin Blagoevgrad. He was selected for the man of the match and his goal was chosen for the best goal of the round. Furthermore, Kolev won the award for the best player of the 4th round in A Grupa.

Nikolay Kostov, the manager of Botev Plovdiv, decided that Aleksandar Kolev is no longer needed by the club. On 3 February 2016, after playing in 33 official games and scoring 5 goals, Kolev was released on a free transfer.

Sandecja Nowy Sącz
Aleksandar Kolev was signed for free in the beginning of the 2017 summer transfer window  and made his debut for the club on 16 July 2017, in a goalless draw against Lech Poznań. His first goal for the club came in a 3–1 away win against Jagiellonia Białystok on 6 August 2017. He scored a decisive brace against Pogoń Szczecin on 27 August 2017, leading his team to victory in a 2–1 home win.

Stal Mielec
On 5 January 2021, Kolev signed for Stal Mielec on a contract until the end of the 2020–21 season. On 14 January 2022, he left the club by mutual consent.

International career
In August 2012, Kolev was called up for the Bulgarian U21 squad. He made his debut in a 1–1 friendly draw against Macedonia U21 on 14 November 2012.

In September 2013 Kolev scored during the 1–3 away defeat of the Bulgarian U21 team from Russia U21.

Kolev scored a goal for Bulgaria U21 in the 2–2 draw with Estonia U21 on 3 September 2014.

While Aleksandar Kolev was playing for Botev Plovdiv, he was included twice in the Bulgarian national football team but he did not participate in any official games.

Honours
Botev Plovdiv
Bulgarian Supercup Runner-up: 2014

Arka Gdynia
Polish Super Cup: 2018

Career statistics

References

External links
 
 

1992 births
Living people
Bulgarian footballers
K.F.C. Dessel Sport players
Botev Plovdiv players
PFC Beroe Stara Zagora players
Stal Mielec players
Sandecja Nowy Sącz players
Arka Gdynia players
Raków Częstochowa players
FC Kaisar players
FC CSKA 1948 Sofia players
First Professional Football League (Bulgaria) players
I liga players
Ekstraklasa players
Kazakhstan Premier League players
Bulgarian expatriate footballers
Expatriate footballers in Belgium
Expatriate footballers in Poland
Expatriate footballers in Kazakhstan
Bulgarian expatriate sportspeople in Belgium
Bulgarian expatriate sportspeople in Poland
Bulgarian expatriate sportspeople in Kazakhstan
Footballers from Sofia
Association football forwards